Şada (also, Sada, Shada, Shadakend, and Shady) is a village and the least populous municipality in the Shahbuz District of Nakhchivan, Azerbaijan. It is located 18 km in the north-west from the district center, on the slope of the Daralayaz ridge. Its population is busy with mainly animal husbandry. There are secondary school, library and a medical center in the village. It has a population of 164.

Qaraboya
Qaraboya (also, Garaboya and Karaboya) - the existed village on the slope of the Ov Mountain in the Shahbuz district. Its population have been resettled in the Shada and Badamlı villages in 1960.

Monuments 
St. Khach or Kamu Khach Monastery was a ruinous Armenian monastery located approximately 2-2.5 km south of the village. The monastery was founded in the 11th or 12th century and was in a ruinous condition in the late Soviet period. It was razed at some point between 1997 and 2008.

See also 
St. Khach Monastery (Shada)

References 

Populated places in Shahbuz District